Marcus lopez is a Hispanic professional boxer.

Professional career

References

People from San Luis Potosí City
Boxers from San Luis Potosí
Super-featherweight boxers
1987 births
Living people
Mexican male boxers